Dwade Aaron Sheehan is an Australian former freestyle swimmer who represented Australia at the 1994 Commonwealth Games in Victoria, British Columbia and the 1994 World Championships in Rome.

Sheehan, who trained at the Commercial Swimming Club in Brisbane, was a member of Australia's gold medal-winning  freestyle team at the 1994 Commonwealth Games. In addition to the relay, Sheehan also came sixth in the 50 metre freestyle final and was fifth in final of the 100 metre freestyle. He now works as a property developer.

References

External links

Year of birth missing (living people)
Living people
Australian male freestyle swimmers
Commonwealth Games gold medallists for Australia
Commonwealth Games medallists in swimming
Medallists at the 1994 Commonwealth Games
Swimmers at the 1994 Commonwealth Games
Swimmers from Brisbane